Augustine "Mazeli" Ofuokwu (14 August 1944 – 5 July 2004) was a Nigerian footballer. He competed in the men's tournament at the 1968 Summer Olympics.

Early Life

Personal Life

Career

References

External links
 

1944 births
2004 deaths
Nigerian footballers
Nigeria international footballers
Olympic footballers of Nigeria
Footballers at the 1968 Summer Olympics
Sportspeople from Jos
Association football defenders